Alberto Vázquez Martínez (born 9 March 1967) is a Mexican politician from the National Action Party. From 2006 to 2009 he served as Deputy of the LX Legislature of the Mexican Congress representing Querétaro.

References

1967 births
Living people
Politicians from Querétaro
National Action Party (Mexico) politicians
21st-century Mexican politicians
Autonomous University of Queretaro alumni
Deputies of the LX Legislature of Mexico
Members of the Chamber of Deputies (Mexico) for Querétaro